Leonardo "Léo" Rigo da Silva (born 25 April 1995) is a Brazilian footballer who plays for Ferroviária as a centre-back.

Career statistics

References

External links

1995 births
Living people
Brazilian footballers
Association football midfielders
Campeonato Brasileiro Série B players
Campeonato Brasileiro Série C players
Campeonato Brasileiro Série D players
Guarani FC players
Esporte Clube Água Santa players
Clube Náutico Marcílio Dias players
Clube Atlético Bragantino players
Ituano FC players
Londrina Esporte Clube players